The Għar Dalam phase, from approximately 5000 to 4100 BCE, is the first of the eleven phases of Maltese prehistory. It is named for Għar Dalam, a cave in the Wied id-Dalam, near Birżebbuġa, in the south-east of the island. The first traces of human habitation on the island date to this phase.

Further reading
p. 178

References

Neolithic cultures of Europe
Pre-Indo-Europeans
Archaeological cultures in Malta
Archaeological cultures of Southern Europe